Unanimous is a United Kingdom-based game show broadcast on Channel 4 from 27 October 2006 to 15 December 2006. It was based on an American game show titled Unan1mous.

Unanimous: The Fallout, was shown on E4 later at night after Unanimous. It was hosted by comedians Paddy McGuinness and Olivia Lee and featured regular guest Karl Daly, played by Tom Bennett.

The 'Host' of the show was Alex Humes. Although fairly unknown, Humes starred in the reality TV programme Space Cadets, also for Channel 4, where he played one of the Russian pilots. The voice-over for the programme was provided by Phil Gallagher.

The show was not live but was recorded many weeks before airing. Contestants were not informed of the rules or objectives of the game before it started – only that they were going to be playing in a game show with a substantial prize fund, and they would be filmed non-stop in an enclosed environment.

Concept
Nine strangers are locked together in a bunker and told they cannot leave until they unanimously choose to award one of them the grand prize money. Contestants are isolated from the outside world, and have no access to any time references.  If a contestant leaves the bunker, the amount of the available prize is cut in half.

Votes are cast by each contestant taking a ball and selecting the name of one of the other contestants via a roller inside of it (a person's own name is not included in their ball). If a vote is not unanimous, something negative happens to the players in order to increase the pressure to reach a unanimous decision. Throughout the course of the game, these were the "punishments" the players received:
The contestants select three random envelopes, each containing a secret about one of them. It is not known whose secrets are being read, and contestants vote to decide which secret is the worst. The holder of that secret is "outcast" from the game, meaning they are no longer eligible to win the money, but that they will remain in the bunker (wearing a special uniform) and continue to vote. Outcast players are also still subject to the rule that if anyone leaves, the amount will be halved. (After Vote 1)
All contestants (including Outcasts) must in turn vote. The contestant who gets the fewest votes is subsequently made an "outcast" (after Votes 2 & 3)
The contestants are told that every second they can not reach a unanimous decision will cost them £1 (which totals £86,400 a day) -  the money will not stop shrinking until either they all agree who wins it, or the money goes down to nothing. Meaning either they agree who gets it, or no one does. Before every vote the clock is stopped. If they do not agree the clock is restarted after the end of the vote.

The Bunker
All voting takes place in the raised "Inner Circle". On the wall in front of it is a large screen where the unnamed host of the show (actually Alex Humes) appears when it is time to vote. Contestants sit around the table to vote, and when told to do so drop the voting spheres down holes in the table. The spheres come out subsequently in front of the host.
The isolation booth is a room on a raised level which is higher than any other room in the bunker. Contestants may sometimes be asked to here to vote to make a contestant an "outcast". Contestants have also been asked to nominate a member to go there for other purposes –
In the second episode, the group was asked to nominate one contestant to enter the booth, whilst the rest of the group openly discussed this contestant. The contestant who was nominated was Kamran. While he was in the isolation booth he was given the opportunity to phone home or to listen in on their conversation. He listened in on their conversation.
In the third episode, the host instructed all outcasts to go to the isolation booth claiming that they were going to hear a piece of information about one of the contestants. The Outcasts were Anna and Kamran. When in the isolation room they found that there was not actually any information and subsequently were given the choice by the host that they either told the contestants nothing or told them what had happened.

Cast and vote table

Reception
Unanimous did not attract high ratings and could therefore be considered commercially unsuccessful. The opening episode attracted just 990,000 viewers, falling to under 450,000 by episode four and less than 350,000 by episode seven. The final episode attracted just over 370,000 viewers. Such a sharp fall in ratings could be largely due to the time-slot change from 9pm to 8pm from episode four onwards, thus forcing the show to compete for viewers with EastEnders on BBC One.

External links
 Unreality TV - Unanimous News, Gossip and Chat
 Unanimous Press Release on ukgameshows.com.

References

Channel 4 original programming
2006 British television series debuts
2006 British television series endings
British television series based on American television series